The Institution of Metallurgists was a British professional association for metallurgists, largely involved in the iron and steel industry.

History
It was founded in 1945. The inaugural meeting was held on 28 November 1945; the organization was formed by the Iron and Steel Institute and the Institute of Metals.

The International Iron and Steel Institute was formed in 1967, which is now the World Steel Association. by the late 1960s the Institution had around 10,000 metallurgists.

It was involved in the formation of the Association of Professional Scientists and Technologists (APST) in 1971, which was formed as a result of the Industrial Relations Act 1971.

Education
In September 1965, Ordinary National Certificates in science were introduced, in consultation with the Institution, the Royal Institute of Chemistry, the Institute of Physics, the Physical Society, the Institute of Biology, and the Mathematical Association.

In January 1969, these same set of institutions set up the Council of Science and Technology Institutes (CSTI), which ended up as the Science Council in 2003.

Royal Charter
It was given a Royal Charter in 1975. In 1977 it became the sixteenth constituent of the •Council of Engineering Institutions, which became the Engineering Council in 1981.

Merger
It merged with the Metals Society to become Institute of Metals on 1 January 1985.

Structure
In the 1960s it was headquartered at 17 Belgrave Square in the City of Westminster. In the 1970s it moved to Northway House on the A1000 (High Road) in north London.

Registrar-Secretaries
 Arthur Merriman 1946-57
 Terry Marsden 1976-81

Presidents
Source: The Institute of Materials, Minerals and Mining

See also
 Institution of Mining and Metallurgy
 Institute of Metallurgical Technicians

References

1945 establishments in the United Kingdom
1984 disestablishments in the United Kingdom
Defunct professional associations based in the United Kingdom
Metallurgical organizations
Organisations based in the City of Westminster
Organisations based in the United Kingdom with royal patronage
Organizations disestablished in 1984
Scientific organizations established in 1945
Steel industry of the United Kingdom